Olbia is a city in Sardinia, Italy.

Olbia may also refer to:

Places

Europe 
 Province of Olbia-Tempio, a former province in Sardinia, Italy
 Pontic Olbia, ancient city and archaeological site in Ukraine
 An ancient settlement in Hyères commune in the Var department, Provence-Alpes-Côte d'Azur region, southeastern France

Elsewhere 
 Olbia (Bithynia) or Astacus, an ancient town of Bithynia, now in Anatolia (Asian Turkey) 
 Olbia (Cilicia), an ancient town of Cilicia, now in Anatolia (Asian Turkey)
 Olbia (Egypt), an ancient city later called Arsinoe
 Olbia (Pamphylia), an ancient town of Pamphylia, now in Anatolia (Asian Turkey)
 Olbia, Libya, an ancient city and former bishopric, now a Latin Catholic titular see
 Olbia, alias Nicomedia, presently İzmit in Anatolia (Asian Turkey)

Other 
 Lavatera olbia, a species of plants in the genus Lavatera
 Olbia Calcio 1905, Sardianian football (soccer) club 
 MS Cruise Olbia, a fast ropax ferry operated by Grimaldi Lines on their Civitavecchia-Olbia route
 Olbia Costa Smeralda Airport 
 Olbia (bug), a genus of stink bugs or shield bugs in the family Pentatomidae

See also 
 Olba (disambiguation)